Peter Katis is an American Grammy Award-winning record producer, audio engineer, mixer, and musician.

Katis is best known for working with alternative and indie rock bands. He works primarily out of his own residential studio, Tarquin Studios, in Bridgeport, Connecticut.

Personal life
Peter Katis was born in New York City in April 1966. He is the eldest son of Dr. Lauma Katis and Dr. James Katis, both psychiatrists. His brothers are Tom and Tarquin.

Katis attended New Canaan Country School and Greenwich High School, both in Connecticut. He graduated from the University of Vermont having majored in Visual Arts and minored in English. He also attended and then taught studio production classes at SUNY Purchase in New York.

Katis lives in Fairfield, Connecticut, with his wife, Ann Risen Katis, and their son, Will.

Music career
Peter Katis's music career began in the late 1980s with The Philistines Jr., an experimental pop band composed of Katis (vocals, guitar, keyboards), his brother Tarquin Katis (vocals, bass), and their friend Adam Pierce (drums). The band's first gig was an opening spot for Phish in front of a sparse crowd on the campus of the University of Vermont.

The Philistines Jr.'s early albums - Greenwich, CT (1991) and The Continuing Struggle of The Philistines Jr. (1993)—received critical acclaim and charted on college radio stations across North America. The band also received frequent airplay from John Peel on his BBC Radio 1 program. Upon hearing their first album, Peel telephoned the band "just to say how much he liked the record" and invited them to record a Peel Session in London. The band completed three Peel Sessions and concurrent UK tours.

Subsequent albums by The Philistines Jr. include The Sinking of the S.S. Danehower (1996), Analog vs. Digital -or- We Don't Get The Respect We Deserve in Today's Scientific Community (2000), If A Band Plays in the Woods...? (2010), If a Lot of Bands Play in the Woods...? (2011), and "Help!" (2019).

Over time, Katis has also participated in a number of musical side projects, including The Zambonis, The Happiest Guys in the World, The Pants, and James Kochalka Superstar.

Music production career
While recording songs for his own band in an ad-hoc studio set up in his parents' basement, Katis realized he had an affinity for production. "My favorite part of being a musician was producing a record," said Katis.

In 1989 he began taking continuing education classes at SUNY Purchase in studio production, which further developed his recording skills. Katis then worked as an intern, an assistant, and then as an engineer in various recording studios in New York City. As his career progressed, Katis began being asked by his friends in other bands—including Mommyheads, Oneida, Guster, and Mercury Rev—to help record their albums.

By 1998, Katis's demand as a producer, audio engineer, and mixer had grown to the point where he needed a dedicated production space. He bought a 7,000 square foot Victorian home in Bridgeport, Connecticut and transformed it into Tarquin Studios, a residence and recording studio for musicians. Katis has since worked with dozens of artists (see Associated Acts and Discography) at Tarquin Studios.

In 2017, Katis and Chris Frantz of Talking Heads launched a concert series for emerging artists at The Fairfield Theater Company.

Death Cab for Cutie
Katis produced Death Cab for Cutie's The Blue EP (2019). The video for the song £Blue Bloods", was filmed at Tarquin Studios.

Frightened Rabbit
Katis produced Frightened Rabbit's 2008 breakthrough album The Midnight Organ Fight, as well as the 2010 follow-up The Winter of Mixed Drinks. To celebrate the 10-year anniversary of TMOF, Frightened Rabbit released Tiny Changes: A Celebration of Frightened Rabbit's Midnight Organ Fight. Katis's own band, The Philistine's Jr., contributed to the album by covering the song "Bright Pink Bookmark". The album, released in 2019, has also become a tribute to Frightened Rabbit's lead singer Scott Hutchison.

Gang of Youths
Katis mixed The Positions (2015) and Go Farther in Lightness (2017) for the Australian band Gang of Youths. The former album debited at No. 5 on the ARIA Albums Chart and was nominated for 5 ARIA Music Awards. The latter album debuted at No. 1 on the ARIA Albums Chart and was nominated for 8 ARIA Music Awards, winning four: Album of the Year, Best Group, Best Rock Album, and Producer of the Year.

Katis's band, The Philistine's Jr., opened for Gang of Youths on several west coast dates of their 2018 American tour.

Interpol
Katis also has a long-standing relationship with Interpol. He recorded and mixed the band's critically acclaimed debut album Turn on the Bright Lights (2002), followed by Antics (2004). He also worked with lead singer Paul Banks on Julian Plenti is... Skyscraper (2009), Julian Plenti Lives... (2012), and Banks (2012).

The National
Katis has worked with The National on eight of their albums: Sad Songs for Dirty Lovers (2003), Cherry Tree (2004), Alligator (2005), Boxer (2007), High Violet (2010), Trouble Will Find Me (2013), Sleep Well Beast (2017), and  I Am Easy to Find (2019). Trouble Will Find Me received a Grammy Award nomination for Best Alternative Music Album. Sleep Well Beast received the Grammy Award for Best Alternative Music Album. Katis co-produced and mixed the album.

Illustrating his close personal connection to the band, the cover of Boxer features a photo of The National playing at Katis's wedding reception.

Discography

References

External links
 Tarquin Studios website

1966 births
Living people
Record producers from New York (state)
Record producers from Connecticut
Musicians from Bridgeport, Connecticut
Greenwich High School alumni